Łoziński and Lozinski are the surname of the following people
Krzysztof Łoziński (born in 1948), Polish writer and publicist
Larry Lozinski (born in 1958), Canadian ice hockey player
Marcel Łoziński (born in 1940), Polish film director and screenwriter
Walery Łoziński (1837-1861), Polish writer and publicist
Walery Łoziński (1880-1944), Polish geographer and soil scientist
Władysław Łoziński (1843-1913), Polish writer and historian
Zygmunt Łoziński (1870-1932), Polish Roman Catholic bishop

See also
Lozynskyi